Brigadier General  Normando Costantino (born 1952) is a former Chief of the General Staff of the Argentine Air Force.  He has a degree in Air and Space Systems.

Early life
Costantino was born on March 18, 1952, in Rio Cuarto, where his father was the mayor and his mother a dancer.

Career

Costantino is a veteran of the 1982 Falklands War, where he fought as an A-4C Skyhawk pilot  although his only two missions were aborted (one because a VHF radio problem  and the other an aerial refueling failure from the KC-130 Hercules) 

In November 2006, he was appointed as the overall commander of the Air Force following Eduardo Schiaffino's dismissal by the senior Argentine political leadership.

In July 2013, he was replaced by Mario Miguel Callejo.

References

 

|-

1952 births
Living people
Argentine Air Force brigadiers
Argentine military personnel of the Falklands War
Falklands War pilots